My Girl is a 2020 Chinese streaming television series starring Li Jia Qi and Zhao Yiqin, and tells the story of a makeup artist, who suffers from dissociative identity disorder and a stingy CEO of a cosmetic company.

Synopsis 
When Meng Hui was a child, she was accidentally injured by Shen Yi, leaving a big scar on her face and causing her a dissociative identity disorder. Shen Yi escaped responsibility because of his young age, but both of them grew up with their own respective "scars." One day, they came across each other again when Meng Hui, now a makeup artist, meets Shen Yi, now CEO of the cosmetics company LS.

Cast

Main Cast

Supporting Cast

Soundtrack

Fun Facts
 This is the second time Zhao Yiqin and Li Jia Qi work as an onscreen couple, their first works is Wait, My Youth
 The writer Nan Zhen also write another popular drama The Romance of Tiger and Rose

References

External links
 My Girl on Weibo
 My Girl on Douban
 

Chinese romance television series
2020 web series debuts
2020 Chinese television series debuts
2020 Chinese television series endings
Chinese romantic comedy television series